Bodianus neilli, the Bay of Bengal hogfish, is a species of wrasse in the family Labridae. It is found in the Indian Ocean in reefs off the coasts of the Maldives, Sri Lanka, India, Myanmar and Thailand, although records from the Maldives are doubtful. Bodianus neilli was described as Cossyphus neilli in 1867 by Francis Day with the type locality given as Madras.

Etymology
The specific name honours Day's friend, A.G Brisbane Neill.

References

External links
http://www.fishbase.org/summary/25412

neilli
Fish of Thailand
Taxa named by Francis Day
Fish described in 1867